Thomas J. McCracken Jr. (born October 27, 1952) was an American lawyer and politician.

McCracken was born in Chicago, Illinois. He received his bachelor's degree from Marquette University and his Juris Doctor degree from Loyola University Chicago School of Law. McCracken lived in Downers Grove, Illinois with his wife and family and practiced law in Chicago. He served in the Illinois House of Representatives in 1982 and was then a Republican. McCracken then served in the Illinois Senate in 1993 and then resigned from the Illinois General Assembly.

References

1952 births
Living people
Lawyers from Chicago
Politicians from Chicago
People from Downers Grove, Illinois
Loyola University Chicago School of Law
Marquette University alumni
Republican Party Illinois state senators
Republican Party members of the Illinois House of Representatives